Alan Hornery was an Australian rugby league footballer who played in the 1940s and 1950s.  He played for Western Suburbs in the New South Wales Rugby League (NSWRL) competition and for Souths in the Brisbane competition.

Playing career
Hornery made his first grade debut in 1948.  Hornery did not play in the club's premiership victory over Balmain at season's end.  In 1950, Wests reached the 1950 NSWRL grand final against South Sydney.  Hornery played at hooker as Souths defeated Western Suburbs 21–15 at the Sydney Sports Ground.  The following season, Wests finished fourth on the table and reached the finals again.  Hornery's last game for the club was the 37-9 semi final defeat against Manly-Warringah. The former Wests hooker went on to have a long career in the Brisbane competition. 

Hornery then departed Western Suburbs and signed with Brisbane side Souths. He made his Queensland State debut in 1953, and toured with New Zealand with Australian side, although he did not appear in a Test. He garnered another 14 appearances over the next four years, playing against Great Britain (1954) and French (1955) teams, which were both on tour. Hornery was part of the Souths team which won the 1953 premiership.  In the same year, Hornery was selected to play for Queensland and played a total of 15 representative games between 1953 and 1957.  Hornery was later voted in the Souths team of the century.

Career Statistics

References

Western Suburbs Magpies players
Souths Logan Magpies players
Australian rugby league players
Rugby league players from Sydney
Queensland rugby league team players
Rugby league hookers
Year of birth missing
Place of birth missing
Possibly living people
Place of death missing